The Real World: Denver is the eighteenth season of MTV's reality television series The Real World, which focuses on a group of diverse strangers living together for several months in a different city each season, as cameras follow their lives and interpersonal relationships. It is the second season to be filmed in the Mountain States region of the United States, specifically in Colorado.

The season featured seven people who lived in a two-story building  in the Lower Downtown area of Denver, Colorado, which production started from late May to September 2006. It premiered on November 22 of that year and consisted of 28 episodes, which along with the twelfth season, is the highest number to date. The season premiere was watched by 4.3 million viewers.

Assignment
Almost every season of The Real World, beginning with its fifth season, has included the assignment of a season-long group job or task to the housemates, continued participation in which has been mandatory to remain part of the cast since the Back to New York season. The Denver cast worked for Outward Bound. They were trained on wilderness courses and later guided New Orleans teenagers displaced by Hurricane Katrina in hiking treks.

The residence
The , two-story building is located in Lower Downtown (LoDo) Denver, a historic district and mixed-use neighborhood. Constructed in 1963, the building was sold in late April for $2.7 million to 1920 Market Street, LLC, a holding company that included the producers of the series. The Denver LoDo building was the first property in the 18 seasons of The Real World that Bunim-Murray Productions purchased for the filming of the series. Bunim-Murray had to seek permission from the city to temporarily rezone it from its commercial status to residential. The purchase of the building included extensive renovations. On December 1, 2006, the building was sold for $3.3 million to Steve and Shane Alexander, partners in The Alexander Group, LLC. The sale included all of the furnishings that were used for the filming of the series, except for the artwork, which had been on loan.

Cast

: Age at time of filming.

Episodes

After filming
After the cast left the Real World house, all seven of them appeared to discuss their experiences both during and since their time on the show, Welcome to the Mile High Club: The Real World Denver Reunion, which premiered on May 23, 2007, and was hosted by Susie Castillo.

At the 2008 The Real World Awards Bash, Davis and Tyrie won "Best Fight", Colie won "Biggest Playa" and Brooke won "Best Meltdown" (for which she was nominated twice. Other nominees included Alex and Jenn, as well as Brooke and Jenn (and Tyrie) for "Steamiest Scene", Tyrie for "Best Brush with the Law", Jenn for "Hottest Female" and "Best Dance-Off", and Alex for "Hottest Male".

In 2016, Tyrie Ballard welcomed his first daughter, named Elyssa Diem in honor of the late Diem Brown.

Davis Mallory has been sober since 2017. That same year, he released his first EP, Loud. In 2018, he dropped a video for his single "Sun & Moon". His discography also includes a song he wrote in memory of Diem Brown titled "Beautiful Girls".

In 2019, Colie Edison started serving as the CEO of the Professional Bowlers Association and later appeared on season 10 of Undercover Boss.

Jenn Grijalva's first son, Thiago Angelo Diaz was born in January 2021.

The Challenge

Challenges in bold indicate that the cast member was a finalist on the Challenge.

References

External links
 MTV's The Real World: Denver official site
 The Real World: Denver House
 The Real World and Road Rules Blog

Denver
Television shows set in Colorado
2006 American television seasons
2007 American television seasons
2006 in Colorado
2007 in Colorado
Television shows filmed in Colorado